Markus Joenmäki is a Finnish professional football defender who currently plays in defence for the Veikkausliiga side FC Lahti in Finland.

References
Guardian Football

1988 births
Living people
Veikkausliiga players
FC Lahti players
Finnish footballers
Association football defenders